Damnationism (damnation+-ism) may refer to:

 Special salvation, or the opposite of general salvation
 Extra Ecclesiam nulla salus
 Feeneyism
 Annihilationism